A goodwill tour is a tour by someone or something famous to a series of places, with the purpose of expressing benevolent interest or concern for a group of people or a region, improving or maintaining a relationship between parties, and exhibiting the item or person to places visited.

Goodwill tours are meant to be friendly; however, in some cases, they may be intimidating to the people or the government at the place visited. At the same time, a visit by a goodwill tour might be used as a way of "reminding" the place and government visited of a friendship previously established or assumed.

Examples of the term 
 A goodwill tour of the Mediterranean by ships of the U.S. Navy.
 A goodwill tour by the Graf Zeppelin.
 A goodwill tour of the Commonwealths by the monarch.
 A goodwill tour of South America by the Pope.
 A goodwill tour of the United States by James Monroe

Notable goodwill tours 
 The Latin America goodwill tour by President-elect Herbert Hoover in November–December 1928.
 The goodwill tour by the USS Maine (ACR-1) to Havana harbor.
 The goodwill tour to Japan by Admiral Perry in 1852.
 The goodwill tour to Japan by the San Francisco Seals (baseball) in 1949.
Jacqueline Kennedy's 1962 goodwill tour of India and Pakistan
 The worldwide GIANTSTEP-APOLLO 11 Presidential Goodwill Tour by the Apollo 11 astronauts in 1969.

External links 
 Laura Bush visits Middle East in goodwill tour
 "Dance Troupe From Israel Wraps Up Goodwill Tour of America"
 "Denver Nuggets Goodwill Tour"

Ceremonies
Naval ceremonies
Diplomacy